Porkkalam is a 2010 Indian Tamil-language action film Directed, Saroj Kumar. Starring Kishore of Polladhavan and Vennila Kabadi Kuzhu fame, Tinnu Anand, who starred in Mani Ratnam's Nayakan and Bombay, comedy actor Sathyan and Smitha, a newcomer from Karnataka, in lead roles and seven artists as Villains, the film has musical score by Rohit Kulkarni. The film was released on 14 January 2010.

Cast
 Kishore as Karnan
 Tinnu Anand as Bhismaki
 Sathyan as Sathya
 Smitha as Sneha
 Lal as Aslam Bhai
 Sampath Raj as Dhronam Raju
 Biju Menon as Inspector Rangasamy
 Santhana Bharathi
 Ponvannan as Pasupathy
 Rajesh as Karnan's Father
 Atheesh as Obulage
 Srinivasan 
 Joe Anthony
 Santhoshi as Karnan's mother

Production
The first schedule was shot in late 2008 in various places in Tamil Nadu including Dhanushkodi, Madurai, Tenkasi, Thiruchendur, Karaikudi and Rameswaram. Following this, the film's second schedule was shot from 13 October 2008 to 26 November 2008 in the parts of Chennai and Puducherry and in the Ramoji Film City, in Hyderabad, while in January 2009, the third and last schedule was shot in several places in Thailand. The film was also heavily publicized through the internet prior through release, on social networking sites.

Release

Reception
The film opened in a few centres across Chennai, Tamil Nadu to an average opening. The film which grossed Rs. 5,70,286 in the opening weekend in Chennai and became a failure at the box-office. Baradwaj Rangan of The Hindu wrote,"In Porkalam, the first-time director Bandi Saroj Kumar (who’s barely in his mid-twenties, I hear) takes the visual-narrative to a wholly different level, in the sense that this is a film that might actually have worked without dialogue."

Soundtrack

Film score and the soundtrack are composed by Rohit Kulkarni, despite early indications that Yuvan Shankar Raja would compose the music. The songs were released straight to the shelves, with the album containing several debutant singers.

References

External links
 
 

2010 films
2010s Tamil-language films
2010 directorial debut films